"She Couldn't" is a ballad by American rock band Linkin Park. Originally leaked in 2009, it was later officially released in 2020 as the first single from the 20th Anniversary Edition re-release of their debut album, Hybrid Theory.

Background 
The song was originally recorded in 1999 while Linkin Park was recording material for their debut studio album, Hybrid Theory. The song was one of the first songs recorded by the band after frontman Chester Bennington had joined.  An unofficial, bootleg version of the song surfaced in 2009 when a fan purchased a demo CD containing the song from eBay and leaked it. After the band hinted at releasing material earlier in the week, the song was officially released on August 13, 2020, in promotion of the band's 20th anniversary re-release of Hybrid Theory. Its initial release was through a website created by the band to look like a computer desktop from the year 2000. The track is one of twelve unreleased tracks that was featured on the release.

Themes and composition 
The song was described as sounding similar to the material that made it on to the original Hybrid Theory album despite its softer sound and longer run-time of over five minutes. The song is more of a ballad and lacks the heavy guitar sound on much of the album, instead focusing on beats, loops, and Bennington's vocals. Rolling Stone described the song's sound as having a "mellow groove with a simple guitar loop twisting around trip hop drums, synths, and record-scratching texture". Late frontman Chester Bennington provides vocals for the verses, while the band's other vocalist, Mike Shinoda, provides the chorus. Additionally, the chorus features a Mos Def vocal sample from the High and Mighty's song "B-Boy Document 99". Shinoda noted the mellower, softer sound of the song foreshadowed the band's change in musical direction found later in the band's career, explaining it was always an approach the band had explored.

Reception 
Kerrang! praised the song for sounding like it belonged on Hybrid Theory, stating "Despite its softness and lack of the heavy guitars...despite its length and willingness to run at its own pace...you could slot this anywhere in the album's second half and it wouldn't jar. It may be the one that got away, but it doesn't sound like something that didn't work".

Personnel 
Linkin Park
 Chester Bennington – vocals
 Mike Shinoda – rap vocals, sampler
 Brad Delson – guitars, bass
 Joe Hahn – turntables, samples
 Rob Bourdon – drums

Other musicians
 Kyle Christner – additional bass

Charts

References 

1999 songs
2020 singles
2020s ballads
Linkin Park songs
Songs released posthumously
Songs written by Brad Delson
Songs written by Chester Bennington
Songs written by Mike Shinoda
Songs written by Mos Def
Warner Records singles